TV 2 Filmkanalen was a Norwegian movie channel. The channel broadcasts 18 hours a day and shows about 420 movies a year.

The channel was closed on 2 March 2015, at 04.30 am, being replaced with TV 2 Humor which began at 06.00 am the same day.

TV 2 (Norway)
Television channels and stations established in 2006
Television channels and stations disestablished in 2015
2006 establishments in Norway
2015 disestablishments in Norway
Defunct television channels in Norway